Self-Titled Tour was the third world tour by American rock band Paramore. The tour is in support of their fourth studio album Paramore (2013). The tour began in Bangkok on February 12, 2013, and continued through parts of Australia, North America, Europe, and South America.

The tour cycle included Paramore's first headlining show at the Madison Square Garden on November 13, 2013, and was the last touring cycle to feature bassist Jeremy Davis. Hayley Williams stated that Paramore had been planning this tour for a while, and that this tour would be the band's biggest production with its longest setlist.

2013 Paramore Tours

Pre-Album Cycle Shows

Opening acts
 Asia: mewithoutYou
 Sydney: Far Away Stables
 United Kingdom: Charli XCX & Eliza & The Bear

Setlist

Tour dates

2013 North American Spring Tour

Opening act
Kitten (April 25, 2013 – May 21, 2013)

Setlist

Tour dates

European Festival & Concert Tour

Setlist

Tour dates

2013 Latin American Tour

Opening acts
 Mexico: Twenty One Pilots
 Argentina: La Carga
 Chile: Polar

Setlist

Tour dates

2013 European September Tour

Opening acts
Walking On Cars (Dublin)
MakeBelieve (Amsterdam)
Fenech-Soler (Mainland Europe & iTunes Festival)  
Charli XCX (United Kingdom)
Eliza and the Bear (United Kingdom)

Setlist
{{hidden
| headercss = background: #ccccff; font-size: 100%; width: 59%;
| contentcss = text-align: left; font-size: 100%; width: 75%;
| header = September 2, 2013 – September 28, 2013
| content =

"Grow Up"
"Fast In My Car"
"That's What You Get"
"Decode"
"Ignorance"
"Interlude: I'm Not Angry Anymore"
"Now"
"Daydreaming"
"When It Rains"
"Last Hope"
"Brick By Boring Brick"
"Interlude: Holiday"
"crushcrushcrush"
"Ain't It Fun"
"The Only Exception"
"In the Mourning" / "Landslide"
"Pressure"
"Misery Business"
Encore
 "Part II"
 "Interlude: Moving On"
 "Still into You"
}}

Tour dates

The Self-Titled Tour

Opening acts
Hellogoodbye (All Dates)
Metric (United States)
Classified (Vancouver)
Lights (Montreal & Toronto)

Setlist
{{hidden
| headercss = background: #ccccff; font-size: 100%; width: 59%;
| contentcss = text-align: left; font-size: 100%; width: 75%;
| header = October 15, 2013 – November 27, 2013
| content =

"Grow Up"
"Fast In My Car"
"That's What You Get"
"Decode"
"Ignorance"
"Interlude: I'm Not Angry Anymore"
"Now"
"Daydreaming"
"When It Rains"
"Last Hope"
"Brick By Boring Brick"
"Interlude: Holiday"
"crushcrushcrush"
"Ain't It Fun"
"The Only Exception"
"In the Mourning" / "Landslide"
"Pressure"
"Misery Business"
Encore
 "Part II"
 "Interlude: Moving On"
 "Still into You"

Notes
During the Atlanta show, Pressure and Part II were not played.
}}

Tour dates

December Radio Shows

Setlist

Tour dates

End of Year 2013 Concert Gross
Pollstar released their yearly concert tour numbers for 2013. In North America, The Self-Titled Tour came in as the 132nd best selling tour with $6.6 million in total gross, with each show earning an average of about $157,000. Internationally, the tour came in as the 99th best selling tour that year, grossing $14.6 million in total sales, with each show earning an average of about $200,000.

2014 Paramore Tours

2014 Australian / New Zealand Tour

Opening acts
You Me At Six (Australia Only)
Twenty One Pilots

Tour dates

One-Off Shows

Opening acts
Tegan and Sara (Puerto Rico)

Tour dates

Parahoy!

Support acts
Tegan & Sara
New Found Glory
Shiny Toy Guns
mewithoutYou
Bad Rabbits
Reuben Wu
Doug Benson

Tour dates

Monumentour

Opening acts
Fall Out Boy (co-headliner)
New Politics
Bad Suns (St. Paul only)

Tour dates

2015 Paramore Tours

One-Off Show

Setlist

Tour dates

Writing the Future

Opening act
Copeland
Chromeo *Annapolis Only

Setlist

Tour dates

Box office score data

Notes
a This show is a part of the Soundwave
b This show is a part of the South by Southwest
c This show is a part of 98.7 FM's "Penthouse" concert series
d This show is a part of Jimmy Kimmel Live!'s concert series
e This show is a part of 102.9 The Buzz's artist sessions
f This show is a part of Grimey's Record Store Day festivities
g This show is a part of the WRFF Radio 104.5 6th Birthday Show
h This show is a part of the Radio 1's Big Weekend 2013
i This show is a part of supporting Muse on their The 2nd Law Tour
j This show is a part of the Voodoo Experience festival
k This show is a part of the WIOQ Q102 Jingle Ball 2013 Holiday Show
l This show is a part of the KBKS-FM 106.1 KISS FM Jingle Ball 2013 Holiday Show
m This show is a part of the WKSC-FM 103.5 KISS FM Jingle Ball 2013 Holiday Show
n This show is a part of the WHTZ Z100 Jingle Ball 2013 Holiday Show
o This show is a part of the WXKS-FM Kiss 108 Jingle Ball 2013 Holiday Show
p This show is a part of the Hot 99.5 Jingle Ball 2013 Holiday Show
q This show is a part of the Cartoon Network Celebrates Summer at Atlantis event
r This show is a part of the Reading and Leeds Festivals
s This show is a part of the iHeartRadio Music Festival
t This show is a part of the Circuito Banco do Brasil Festival
u This show is a part of SunFest
v This show is a part of the Beale Street Music Festival
w This show is a part of the Hangout Festival
x This show is a part of the Hangout Festival
x This show is a part of 102.1 The Edge's Edgefest

Cancellations and rescheduled shows

References

External links

2013 concert tours
2014 concert tours
2015 concert tours
Paramore concert tours